Svitlana (Ukrainian: Світлана) is a Ukrainian language female given name and may refer to:

Svitlana Akhadova (born 1993), Ukrainian canoeist
Svitlana Azarova (born 1976), Ukrainian/Dutch composer of contemporary classical music
Svitlana Bilyayeva (born 1946), archaeologist specialising in Ukraine, the Golden Horde and the Ottoman Empire
Svitlana Bondarenko (born 1971), former international breaststroke swimmer from Ukraine
Svitlana Chernikova (born 1977), Ukrainian former competitive ice dancer
Svitlana Fil (born 1969), Soviet rower
Svitlana Frishko, Ukrainian football striker
Svitlana Gorbenko, Paralympian athlete from Ukraine
Svitlana Halyuk (born 1987), Ukrainian professional racing cyclist
Svitlana Iaromka (born 1989), Ukrainian judoka
Svitlana Kashchenko (born 1968), Russian-born Nicaraguan sport shooter
Svitlana Konstantynova (born 1975), Ukrainian speed skater
Svitlana Kopchykova (born 1967), Ukrainian swimmer
Svitlana Kryvoruchko (born 1975), Ukrainian journalist, CEO in BTB and Kyiv TV channels
Svitlana Kudelya (born 1992), Paralympian athlete from Ukraine
Svitlana Loboda (born 1982), Ukrainian singer and composer
Svitlana Malkova (born 1990), Ukrainian trampoline gymnast, member of the national team
Svitlana Mamyeyeva (born 1982), Ukrainian triple jumper
Svitlana Mankova (born 1962), Ukrainian former handball player
Svitlana Matevusheva (born 1981), Ukrainian sailor
Svitlana Mayboroda (born 1981), Ukrainian professor of mathematics at the University of Minnesota
Svitlana Maziy (born 1968), retired rower and twice Olympic medallist from Ukraine
Svitlana Oleksiivna Shvachko (born 1935), Professor of Germanic Philology in Sumy State University
Svitlana Prokopova (born 1993), Ukrainian group rhythmic gymnast
Svitlana Prystav, Ukrainian former pair skater
Svitlana Pylypenko (born 1983), Ukrainian former competitive figure skater
Svitlana Pyrkalo (born 1976), London-based Ukrainian writer, journalist and translator
Svitlana Semchouk (born 1984), track and road cyclist from Ukraine
Svitlana Serbina (born 1980), Ukrainian Olympic diver
Svitlana Shatalova (born 1983), Ukrainian political figure, deputy Governor of Odessa Oblast
Svitlana Shmidt (born 1990), Ukrainian middle-distance runner
Svitlana Spiriukhova (born 1982), Ukrainian rower
Svitlana Stanko-Klymenko (born 1976), Ukrainian long-distance runner
Svitlana Yeremenko (born 1959), Ukrainian journalist, writer, NGO manager
Svitlana Zakharova (singer) (born 1987), Ukrainian singer-songwriter
Svitlana Zalishchuk (born 1982), politician, human rights campaigner, former member of Ukrainian Parliament
Svitlana Zelepukina (born 1980), Ukrainian gymnast

See also
Svetlana (Cyrillic: Светлана), a Slavic female given name
Svetlina (disambiguation), several villages in Bulgaria
Sviatlana (Belarusian: Святлана), a Belarusian female given name

Ukrainian feminine given names